In Italy, freedom of press is guaranteed by the Constitution of 1948. This freedom was specifically established in response to the censorship which occurred during the fascist regime of Benito Mussolini (1922–1945). Censorship continues to be an issue of debate in the modern era.

Censorship in Italy under Fascism (1922–1943) 
Censorship in Italy was not created with Fascism, nor did it end with it, but it had a heavy influence in the life of Italians under the Regime.

The main goals of censorship under fascism were, concisely:
Control over the public appearance of the regime, also obtained with the deletion of any content that could allow opposition, suspicions, or doubts about fascism.
Constant check of the public opinion as a measure of consensus.
Creation of national and local archives (schedatura) in which each citizen was filed and classified depending on their ideas, habits, relationship and any shameful acts or situations which had arisen; in this way, censorship was used as an instrument for the creation of a police state.

Censorship fought ideological and defeatist contents, and any other work or content that would not enforce nationalist fascism.

Censorship in public communications 
This branch of the activity was mainly ruled by the Ministero della Cultura Popolare (Ministry of popular culture), commonly abbreviated as "Min. Cul. Pop.". This administration had authority over all the contents that could appear in newspapers, radio, literature, theatre, cinema, and generally any other form of communication or art.

In literature, editorial industries had their own controlling servants steadily on site, but sometimes it could happen that some texts reached the libraries and in this case an efficient organization was able to capture all the copies in a very short time.

An important note on the issue of censoring foreign language use: with the "Autarchia" (the general maneuver for self-sufficiency) foreign languages had effectively been banned, and any attempt to use a non-Italian word resulted in a formal censoring action. Reminiscences of this ban could be detected in the dubbing of all foreign movies broadcast on RAI (Italian state owned public service broadcaster): captioning is very rarely used. 
Censorship did not however impose heavy limits on foreign literature, and many of the foreigner authors were freely readable. Those authors could freely frequent Italy and even write about it, with no reported troubles.

In 1930 it was forbidden to distribute books that contained Marxist, Socialist or Anarchist like ideologies, but these books could be collected in public libraries in special sections not open to the general public. The same happened for the books that were sequestrated. All these texts could be read under authorization for scientific or cultural purposes, but it is said that this permission was quite easy to obtain. In 1938 there were public bonfires of forbidden books, enforced by fascists militias ("camicie nere"): any work containing themes about Jewish culture, freemasonry, communist, socialist ideas, were removed also by libraries (but it has been said that effectively the order was not executed with zeal, being a very unpopular position of the Regime). To avoid police inspections, many librarians preferred to hide or privately sell the texts, which in many cases were found at the end of the war .

Censorship and press 
It has been said that Italian press censored itself before the censorship commission could do it. Effectively the actions against press were formally very few, but it has been noted that due to press hierarchical organization, the regime felt to be quite safe, controlling it by the direct naming of directors and editors through the "Ordine dei Giornalisti".

Most of the intellectuals that after the war would have freely expressed their anti-fascism, were however journalists during fascism, and quite comfortably could find a way to work in a system in which news directly came from the government (so-called "veline", by the tissue-paper used for making as many copies as possible using typewriters with carbon paper) and only had to be adapted to the forms and the styles of each respective target audience.

Newer revisionists talk about a servility of journalists, but are surprisingly followed in this concept by many other authors and by some leftist ones too, since the same suspect was always attributed to Italian press, before, during and after the Ventennio, and still in recent times the category has not completely demonstrated yet its independence from "strong powers". A well known Italian journalist writer, Ennio Flaiano, certainly an anti-fascist, used to say that journalists do not need to care of "that irrelevant majority of Italians".

Independent (illegal) press used clandestine print and distribution, and were mainly connected with the activities of local political groups.

The control on legitimate papers was practically operated by faithful civil servants at the printing machines and this allows reporting a common joke affirming that any text that could reach readers had been "written by the Duce and approved by the foreman".

Fascist censorship promoted papers with wider attention to mere chronology of delicate political moments, to distract public opinion from dangerous passages of the government. Press then created "monsters" or focused on other terrifying figures (murderers, serial killers, terrorists, pedophiles, etc.). When needed, an image of a safe ordered State was instead to be stressed, then police were able to capture all the criminals and, as a famous topic says, trains were always in perfect time. All these maneuvers were commonly directed by MinCulPop directly.

After fascism, democratic republic did not change the essence of the fascist law on press, which is now organized as it was before, like the law on access to the profession of journalist remained unaltered.

About satire and related press, Fascism was not more severe, and in fact a famous magazine, Marc'Aurelio, was able to live with little trouble. In 1924-1925, during the most violent times of fascism (when squads used brutality against opposition) with reference to the death of Giacomo Matteotti killed by fascists, Marc'Aurelio published a series of heavy jokes and "comic" drawings describing dictator Benito Mussolini finally distributing peace; eternal peace, in this case. Marc'Aurelio however would have turned to a more integrated tone during the following years and in 1938 (the year of the racial laws) published tasteless anti-Semitic contents.

Censorship in private communications 
Quite obviously, any telephone call was at risk of being intercepted and, sometimes, interrupted by censors.

Not all the letters were opened, but not all those read by censors had the regular stamp that recorded the executed control. Most of the censorship was probably not declared, to secretly consent further police investigations.

Chattering en plein air was indeed very risky, as a special section of investigators dealt with what people were saying on the roads; an eventual accusation by some policeman in disguise was evidently very hard to disprove and many people reported of having been falsely accused of anti-national sentiments, just for personal interests of the spy. Consequently, after the first cases, people commonly avoided talking publicly.

Military censorship 
The greatest amount of documents about fascist censorship comes from the military commissions for censorship.

This is also due to some facts: first of all the war had brought many Italians far from their houses, creating a need for writing to their families that previously did not exist. Secondarily, in a critic situation as a war can be, obviously military authorities were compelled to a major activity to control eventual internal oppositions, spies or (most important) defeatists. Finally, the result of the war could not allow fascists to hide or delete these documents (which it is supposed might have happened for other ones before the war), that remained in public offices where they were found by occupying troops. So we can now read thousands of letters that soldiers sent to their families, and these documents revealed as a unique resource for sociology (and general knowledge about those times).

The work was daily organized, resumed and composed in a note that daily was received by Mussolini or his apparatus and by the other major authorities.

Notes reported, i.e., what soldiers could think about relevant events, what was the opinion in Italy, similar arguments.

Italians reaction against censorship 
The fact that Italians were well aware of the fact that any communication could be intercepted, recorded, analyzed and eventually used against them, caused that censorship in time became a sort of usual rule to consider, and soon most people used jargons or other conventional systems to overtake the rules. Opposition was expressed in satiric ways or with some ingeniously studied legal tricks, one of which was to sing publicly the Hymn of Sardinia, which should have been forbidden not being in Italian language, but it could not be forbidden being one of the symbols of the Savoy house.

It has to be said that in most of the small villages, life continued as before, since the local authorities used a very familiar style in executing such orders. Also in many urban realities, civil servants used little zeal and more humanity. But the general effect was indeed relevant.

In theatre censorship caused a revival of "canovaccio" and Commedia dell'arte: given that all the stories had to obtain a prior permission before being performed, stories were summarized and officially were improvisations on a given theme.

Modern censorship in Italy 
One of the most important cases of censorship in Italy was the banning of one episode of the TV show Le Iene showing use of cocaine in the Italian Parliament.
As with all the other media of Italy, the Italian television industry is widely considered both inside and outside the country to be overtly politicized. According to a December 2008 poll, only 24% of Italians trust television news programmes, compared unfavourably to the British rate of 38%, making Italy one of only three examined countries where online sources are considered more reliable than television ones for information.

Italy put an embargo on foreign bookmakers over the Internet (in violation of EU market rules) by mandating certain edits to DNS host files of Italian ISPs. Italy is also blocking access to websites containing child pornography.

Advertisements promoting Videocracy, a Swedish documentary examining the influence of television on Italian culture over the last 30 years, was refused airing purportedly because it says the spots are an offense to Premier Silvio Berlusconi.

Movies or anime and cartoons are often modified or cut on national television networks such as Mediaset or RAI. An example of this occurred in December 2008, when Brokeback Mountain was aired on Rai 2 during prime time. Several scenes featuring mildly sexual (or even just romantic) behavior of the two protagonists were cut. This act was severely criticized by Italian LGBT activist organizations and others.

The "Report" case 
In 2009, the board of state television RAI cut funds for legal assistance to the investigative journalism TV program Report (aired by Rai 3, a state-owned channel). The program had tackled sensitive issues in the past that exposed the journalists to legal action (for example the authorization of buildings that did not meet earthquake-resistance specifications, cases of overwhelming bureaucracy, the slow process of justice, prostitution, health care scandals, bankrupt bankers secretly owning multimillion-dollar paintings, waste mismanagement involving dioxine toxic waste, cancers caused by asbestos anti-fire shieldings (Eternit) and environmental pollution caused by a coal power station near the city of Taranto). An accumulation of lawsuits against the journalists in the absence of the funds to handle them could bring the program to an end.

"Freedom of the Press" report 

Before 2004, in the "Freedom of the Press" report, published by the American organization Freedom House, Italy had always been classified as "Free" (regarding the freedom of press). In 2004, it was demoted to "Partly Free", due to "20 years of failed political administration", the "controversial Gasparri's Law of 2003" and the "possibility for prime minister to influence the RAI (Italian state-owned Radio-Television), a conflict of interests among the most blatant in the World".

Italy's status was upgraded to "free" in 2007 and 2008 under the Prodi II Cabinet, to come back as "partly free" since 2009 with the Berlusconi IV Cabinet. Freedom House noted that Italy constitutes "a regional outlier" and particularly quoted the "increased government attempts to interfere with editorial policy at state-run broadcast outlets, particularly regarding coverage of scandals surrounding prime minister Silvio Berlusconi." In their 2011 report, Freedom House continued to list Italy as "partly free" and ranked the country 24th out of 25 in the Western European region, ahead of Turkey.
In 2020 Italy was listed again in The Freedom House report as Free

Anti-defamation actions 
Defamation is a crime in Italy with the possibility of large fines and/or prison terms. Thus anti-defamation actions may intimidate reporters and encourage self-censorship.

In February 2004, the journalist Massimiliano Melilli was sentenced to 18 months in prison and a 100,000 euro fine for two articles, published on 9and 16 November 1996, that reported rumors of "erotic parties" supposedly attended by members of Trieste high society.

In July, magistrates in Naples placed Lino Jannuzzi, a 76-year-old journalist and senator, under house arrest, although they allowed him the possibility of attending the work of the parliament during daytime. In 2002, he was arrested, found guilty of "defamation through the press" ("diffamazione a mezzo stampa"), and sentenced to 29 months' imprisonment because of articles that appeared in a local paper for which he was editor-in-chief. The articles revealed irresponsible operation of the judiciary and highlighted what Jannuzzi called wrong and unjust sentences. Therefore, it was widely perceived that his sentence was given as revenge by the judiciary. Following heavy criticism from home and abroad, in February 2005, Italian President Ciampi pardoned Jannuzzi.

Mediaset and Berlusconi 
Berlusconi's extensive control over the media has been widely criticised by both analysts and press freedom organisations, who allege Italy's media has limited freedom of expression. The Freedom of the Press 2004 Global Survey, an annual study issued by the American organization Freedom House, downgraded Italy's ranking from 'Free' to 'Partly Free' due to Berlusconi's influence over RAI, a ranking that, in "Western Europe" was shared only with Turkey. Reporters Without Borders states that in 2004, "The conflict of interests involving prime minister Silvio Berlusconi and his vast media empire was still not resolved and continued to threaten news diversity". In April 2004, the International Federation of Journalists joined the criticism, objecting to the passage of a law vetoed by Carlo Azeglio Ciampi in 2003, which critics believe is designed to protect Berlusconi's reported 90% control of the Italian television system.

"Editto Bulgaro" 
Berlusconi's influence over RAI became evident when in Sofia, Bulgaria he expressed his views on journalists Enzo Biagi and Michele Santoro, and comedian Daniele Luttazzi. Berlusconi said that they "use television as a criminal mean of communication". They lost their jobs as a result. This statement was called by critics "Editto Bulgaro".

The TV broadcasting of a satirical programme called RAIot - Armi di distrazione di massa (Raiot-Weapons of mass distraction, where "Raiot" is a mangling of Rai which sounds like the English riot) was censored in November 2003 after the comedian Sabina Guzzanti (daughter of Paolo Guzzanti, former senator of Forza Italia) made outspoken criticism of the Berlusconi media empire.

Par condicio 
Mediaset, Berlusconi's television group, has stated that it uses the same criteria as the public (state-owned) television RAI in assigning a proper visibility to all the most important political parties and movements (the so-called par condicio, Latin for 'equal treatment' or 'Fairness Doctrine')—which has been since often disproved.

On June 24, 2009, during the Confindustria young members congress in Santa Margherita Ligure, Italy, Silvio Berlusconi invited advertisers to interrupt or boycott advertising contracts with the magazines and newspapers published by Gruppo Editoriale L'Espresso, in particular the newspaper la Repubblica and the news-magazine L'espresso, calling the publishing group "shameless" for fueling the economic crisis by bringing attention to it. He also accused them of making a "subversive attack" against him. The publishing group announced possible legal proceedings against Berlusconi to protect the image and the interests of the group.

In October 2009, Reporters Without Borders Secretary-General Jean-François Julliard declared that Berlusconi "is on the verge of being added to our list of Predators of Press Freedom", which would be a first for a European leader. In the event, Berlusconi was not declared a Predator of Press Freedom, but RWB continued to warn of "the continuing concentration of media ownership, displays of contempt and impatience on the part of government officials towards journalists and their work" in Italy. Julliard added that Italy will probably be ranked last in the European Union in the upcoming edition of the RWB press freedom index. Italy was in fact ranked last in the EU in RWB's "Press Freedom Index 2010".

Internet censorship 

Italy is listed as engaged in selective Internet filtering in the social area and no evidence of filtering was found in the political, conflict/security, and Internet tools areas by the OpenNet Initiative in December 2010. Access to almost seven thousand websites is filtered in the country.

Filtering in Italy is applied against child pornography, gambling, and some P2P web sites. Starting in February 2009, The Pirate Bay website and IP address are unreachable from Italy, blocked directly by Internet service providers. A controversial verdict issued by the Court of Bergamo, and later confirmed by the Supreme Court, allowed the blocking, stating that it was useful in order to prevent copyright infringement. Pervasive filtering is applied to gambling websites that do not have a local license to operate in Italy.

Several legal tools are in development to monitor and censor Internet access and content. Examples include the Romani law, a special law proposed by parliament after Facebook cases of a group against Prime Minister Berlusconi.

An anti-terrorism law, amended in 2005 by then-Minister of the Interior Giuseppe Pisanu after the terrorists attacks in Madrid and London, used to restrict the opening of new Wi-Fi hotspots. Interested entities were required to first apply for permission to open the hotspot at the local police headquarters. The law required potential hotspot and Internet café users to present an identity document. This has inhibited the opening of hotspots across Italy, with the number of hotspots five times lower than France and led to an absence of municipal wireless networks. In 2009, only 32% of Italian Internet users had Wi-Fi access. After some unsuccessful proposals to facilitate the opening of and access to Wi-Fi hotspots, the original 2005 law was repelled in 2011. In 2013, a new text was approved clarifying that operators are not required to identify users, nor to log the traffic.

Access to the white nationalist forum Stormfront has also been blocked from Italy since 2012.

List of censored films

Fascist era 
Charlie Chaplin, The Great Dictator (satirical movie, 1940 – United States), blocked by Italian fascist regime until 1943 (in southern Italy) and 1945 (in northern Italy).
 All communist, socialist or Russian-made films were forbidden.

Italian Republic Era 
Bernardo Bertolucci, Last Tango in Paris (drama movie, 1973 – France/Italy), blocked by censorship until 1987.
Pier Paolo Pasolini, Salò, or the 120 Days of Sodom (drama movie, 1975 – Italy), blocked by censorship until 1977.
Ruggero Deodato, Cannibal Holocaust (horror movie, 1979 – Italy), blocked by censorship until 1984, later restricted to 18 years or older and therefore blocked on Italian television.
Moustapha Akkad, Lion of the Desert (historical movie, 1981 – United States), blocked by Italian Prime Minister Giulio Andreotti in 1982, finally broadcast in 2009 by the pay television SKY.
Daniele Ciprì and Franco Maresco, Totò che visse due volte (Grotesque Movie, 1998 – Italy), initially blocked by censorship and then restricted to 18 years or older after the directors appeal.
Raffaele Picchio, Morituris (horror movie, 2011 – Italy) blocked by censorship in 2011.

See also 
Censorship
Freedom of the press
Reporters Without Borders
Movimento Italiano Genitori

References

External links 
There is no censorship in Italy, but... Some example of Italian censorship.
The pirate bay protest against Italian illegal censorship from The Pirate Bay official blog.

 
Italy